The New Hampshire Troubadour was a monthly magazine supported by the State Planning and Development Commission of New Hampshire and which was originally published from 1931 to 1951. It was subsequently published under several private owners and titles, most prominently as New Hampshire Profiles.

It was briefly revived under the original name for a few years early in the twenty-first century, as a quarterly magazine published by a 501(c)(3) charitable organization with no paid employees.

The magazine's first editor was Thomas Dreier.

During the Troubadour's original run three covers were illustrated by American artist Maxfield Parrish.

References

External links
 
 January 1948 issue at the Internet Archive

2011 disestablishments in New Hampshire
1931 establishments in New Hampshire
Monthly magazines published in the United States
Defunct magazines published in the United States
Local interest magazines published in the United States
Magazines established in 1931
Magazines disestablished in 2011
Magazines published in New Hampshire
Tourism magazines